Handan Campaign (邯郸战役), also known as Pinghan Campaign (平汉战役), short for Beiping-Hankou Campaign (北平汉口战役), is one of the largest clashes between the communist force and the nationalist force immediately after the end of World War II, which resulted in communist victory.

Nationalist strategy
During the Shangdang Campaign, communist units of the Shanxi-Hebei-Shandong-Henan (晋冀鲁豫) Military Region succeeded in taking control over a 200 km section of the railway from Beijing to Hankou, and the adjacent regions along this section.  Their nationalist enemy were determined to dislodge the communist force from their newly gained territory and planned an offensive that would significantly boost the nationalist bargaining chips in the peace negotiation with the communist opponent.

The nationalist side deployed around 145,000 troops in two echelons, and the first echelon mainly consisted of three armies from the 11th War Zone to strike northward from Xinxiang (新乡) in two fronts: the nationalist left front consisted of the Newly Organized 8th Army and the 30th Army, while the nationalist right front consisted of the 40th Army and the 9th Combat Engineering Regiment.

The second echelon also consisted of two fronts:  In the south, the nationalist 32nd Army of the 11th War Zone would follow the 40th Army to Anyang (安阳), and then would continue and linkup with the 3rd Army and the 16th Army of the nationalist 1st War Zone at Shijiazhuang.  Once the three armies had joined their forces, they would continue push northward and linkup with the 92nd Army and 94th Army, which would strike southward from Beijing, where these two nationalist armies were previously airlifted to the ancient city.

When the link up is completed, the previously communist occupied territory would be firmly back into the nationalist hands.  The nationalist success of the offensive would also secure the passage to northeast China and guarantee the control of northern China.  The commander of the nationalist 40th Army, Ma Fawu (马法五), was also the commander-in-chief of the 11th War Zone, while the commander of the nationalist Newly Organized 8th Army, Gao Shuxun (高树勋), was also the deputy commander-in-chief of the 11th War Zone, and they were in charge of the entire operation.

Communist strategy
The communists plan was to concentrate a total of 60,000 regular army troops from the 1st Column, the 2nd Column, the 3rd Column, and units of Taihang (太行) Military Region, Hebei-Shandong-Henan (Ji-Lu-Yu, 冀鲁豫) Military Region, and Southern Hebei (Ji-Nan, 冀南) Military Region to annihilate the enemy at the Fuyang (滏阳) region north the Zhang River (漳河), and south of Handan, with the help of another 100,000 communist militia.  The strategy was to proceed in several phases:

At the beginning, communist units of the Taihang (太行) Military Region, units of Hebei-Shandong-Henan (Ji-Lu-Yu, 冀鲁豫) Military Region and local militia would destroy railways from the north of Yellow River to Anyang, and harass the enemy to provide time for other communists to group.  After the enemy has crossed the Zhang River (漳河), a detachment of the communist force would immediately control the river crossing point, and thus cutoff the link between the enemy units at Anyang and that had crossed the Zhang River (漳河).  The enemy units that had crossed the Zhang River (漳河) would then be lured into the regions south of Handan and north of Zhang River (漳河) to be ambushed in the pre-selected spot.  The enemy would be annihilated in a pincer movement that consisted of two fronts: the eastern front would consist of the communist 1st Column and units of Hebei-Shandong-Henan (Ji-Lu-Yu, 冀鲁豫) Military Region, while the western front would consist of the communist 2nd Column, 3rd Column, units from Taihang (太行) Military Region and Southern Hebei (Ji-Nan, 冀南) Military Region.

Prelude
The nationalists begun their push on October 14, 1945.  However, majority of the officers and soldiers of the Newly Organized 8th Army, the most capable fighting unit of the nationalist force and thus tasked to bear the brunt of the fighting, were extremely resentful to Chiang Kai-shek and his nationalist regime.  The reason was that the troops originally belonged to Guominjun clique of warlords, but later defected to Chiang Kai-shek.  Unlike many warlords who collaborated with the Japanese invaders during the Second Sino-Japanese War and then rejoined the nationalist regime after World War II, these troops remained firmly on the Chinese side throughout the conflict.  Furthermore, unlike other warlords who stayed on the Chinese side during the conflict but were not under the direct control of Chiang Kai-shek and remained independent instead, such as the case of Yan Xishan, Ma clique, New Guangxi Clique, and Sichuan clique, these troops were directly under control of Chiang Kai-shek and his regime, just like Chiang's own troops.

However, these troops of former Guominjun felt that their loyalty was not rewarded accordingly, and that they were discriminated against by Chiang Kai-shek and his clique.  Such sentiment seemed true because Chiang Kai-shek had planned to solve the warlord problem that had plagued China for so long together through the eradication of communism, which proved to be a fatal mistake.  These former warlords's troops believed that Chiang Kai-shek and his regime felt that they were expendable and used them just as tools of the civil war because instead of sending his crack troops such as the Newly Organized 1st Army, Chiang Kai-shek only send the second-rate troops to fight alongside them, and moreover, they bore the brunt of the fighting instead of Chiang's own troops. Such resentment against Chiang Kai-shek and his regime was exploited to the maximum by their communist enemy in the latter stage of the Handan Campaign, resulting in their defection to the communist side, which proved to be a significant factor that contributed to the nationalist failure.  To complete their plan, many communist agents had already infiltrated the Newly Organized 8th Army prior to the campaign.

Order of battle
Nationalist order of battle
1st Echelon: 7 Divisions with 45,000 troops
Newly Organized 8th Army deployed at Xinxiang
The 30th Army deployed at Xinxiang
The 40th Army deployed at Xinxiang
2nd Echelon: 100,000 troops
The 3rd Army deployed at Shijiazhuang
The 16th Army deployed at Shijiazhuang
The 32nd Army deployed at Anyang
The 92nd Army deployed at Beijing
The 94th Army deployed at Beijing

Communist order of battle
60,000 regulars:
The 1st Column
The 2nd Column
The 3rd Column
Units of Taihang (太行) Military Region
Units of Hebei-Shandong-Henan (Ji-Lu-Yu, 冀鲁豫) Military Region
Units of Southern Hebei (Ji-Nan, 冀南) Military Region
Another 100,000 militia

First stage
By October 20, 1945, the nationalist advance guards had occupied the positions at shore of Zhang River (漳河), covering the troops building the bridges at the crossing point.  On October 22, 1945, the nationalist force had crossed the Zhang River (漳河), where they were met head on with the communist 1st Column deployed south of Handan, and the first shot of the campaign had been fired.  By October 24, 1945, all three nationalist armies had cross the Zhang River (漳河), and under the heavy artillery bombardment, the 106th Division of the nationalist 40th Army assaulted the position of the 1st Brigade of the communist 1st Column, succeeding in breaking through after a day of fierce fighting, penetrating the communist defense at region between Cuiqu (崔曲), Jiati (夹堤), and by the evening, had successfully pushed to Village of Gao (Gozhuang, 高庄), Nanpozi (南泊子) line.  Unbeknown to the nationalist force, the communist force was luring them into their trap, and northern group and the southern group had already begun to encircle the enemy from three directions: south of Handan, west of Magnetic County (Cixian, 磁县) and east of Horse Head Town (Matouzhen, 马头镇).

When the nationalist force had reached the Magnetic County (Cixian, 磁县) and the Horse Head Town (Matouzhen, 马头镇), the communist encirclement was complete, while at the same time, the river crossing of Zhang River (漳河) had also fallen into the communist hands.  Realizing that they were surrounded, the besieged nationalist force retreated toward North and South Zuoliang (左良) and Cuiqu (崔曲), and directly appealed to Chiang Kai-shek for help via radio.  Chiang Kai-shek, in turned, ordered the entire second echelon to be mobilized to help the besieged first echelon by sending everyone available.  However, the nationalist commanders of the second echelon were reluctant and more importantly, impossible to devote their force 100%, and instead, only send small detachments.  On October 26, 1945, a portion of the nationalist 16th Army were sent from Shijiazhuang, but they were stopped by the communist units of the Taihang (太行) Military Region and other local militia units at Gaoyi (高邑).  Meanwhile, the nationalist 32nd Army at Anyang sent out a detachment to reinforce their besieged comrade-in-arms, but this reinforcement from the south was also stopped by the communist force at Zhang River (漳河).

Second stage
At the dusk of October 28, 1945, the full-scale attack on the besieged nationalist force begun.  The communist northern group targeted the nationalist 40th Army while avoiding direct confrontation with the nationalist Newly Organized 8th Army.  By October 30, 1945, the 106th Division of the nationalist 40th Army was nearly wiped out, and the nationalist 30th Army was also badly mauled.  Meanwhile, the communist chief of staff Li Da (李达) personally went to the headquarters of the nationalist Newly Organized 8th Army and successfully convinced its commander, the deputy commander-in-chief of the 11th War Zone, Gao Shuxun (高树勋) to defect to the communist side.  The defection of the most capable fighting unit of the nationalist force struck a devastating blow on the nationalist morale and worsened the situation for the remaining besieged nationalist units.  Sensing the opportunity, the communist commander Liu Bocheng ordered the communist 1st Column and 3rd Column to open up the southern front and set a new trap along the road to lure out the besieged nationalist units from their strongholds.

On October 31, 1945, the nationalist force escaped thru the opening in the south exactly as their communist enemy had expected, and was besieged at regions along the Flagpole Zhang (Qigan Zhang, 旗杆漳), Xin Village (Xin Zhuang, 辛庄), and Horse Camp (Ma Ying, 马营) line when the communist units of the Taihang (太行) Military Region and units of Hebei-Shandong-Henan (Ji-Lu-Yu, 冀鲁豫) Military Region stopped them at the northern shore of Zhang River (漳河).  On November 1, 1945, a detachment of the communist 1st Column had taken the headquarters of the nationalist 40th Army at Flagpole Zhang (Qigan Zhang, 旗杆漳), capturing the nationalist commander-in-chief Ma Fawu (马法五) alive and the nationalist resistance ceased completely by the next day, while the nationalist reinforcement on the road immediately withdraw back to their fortified positions behind the city walls upon hearing the new.  The campaign ended on the November 2, 1945.

Outcome
The communist victory of Handan Campaign was another heavy blow to the nationalist after Shangdang Campaign, and strengthened the communist position in the peace negotiation.  Furthermore, the communist victory had significantly slowed the nationalist deployment along the railway from Beijing to Hankou and thus provided cover for other communist forces to proceed to northeast China.

The most obvious nationalist debacle was Chiang Kai-shek's attempt to solve the warlord problem that had plagued China for so long together with the eradication of the communism by reducing the warlords' power via reducing their military strength, which proved to be a fatal mistake, resulting in nationalist units defecting to the communist side.  However, even Chiang's communist adversary had admitted that Chiang could not and should not be excessively blamed for this because nobody else could do any better, including the communists themselves, had their positions being switched with that of Chiang and his nationalist regime, because Chiang Kai-shek was faced with a huge dilemma: for these troops, the only way to survive was to serve in the armed forces, and if these warlords' troops were not expanded in battles but discharged in peacetime demilitarization, they would be forced to join the communist camp for survival anyway when they were out of jobs, as later proved in places such as northeast China.  When these experienced combat veterans with experience with modern weaponry joined the communist force that was mostly illiterate peasantry army, the combat capability of the communist force would be and had been significantly boosted, and obviously anyone would rather want them perished in fights against the enemy instead of helping the enemy when these troops were to be demilitarized, and Chiang Kai-shek was no exception.

Even if Chiang Kai-shek had not made the fatal mistake of attempting to solve the warlord problem that had plagued China for so long together with the eradication of the communism, the nationalist offensive was destined to fail from the very beginning because Chiang and his nationalist regime had made an even greater fatal mistake:  launching an offensive too early with insufficient strength.  As Chiang had soon painfully realized, the nationalist regime simply did not have enough resource to deploy its troops in very short time span in the vast regions of China.  When the surrounding countryside was dominated by the opposing communist force, launching an offensive of the scale of Handan Campaign with what was currently available for the nationalist side was simply unrealistically overambitious.  Even Chiang Kai-shek's communist adversary did not blame on the nationalist second echelon for not succeeding in rescue their besieged comrade-in-arms, because they were too far away, and in fact, the reinforcement sent by the nationalist 92nd Army and the 94th Army from Beijing did not even meet any enemy before they were turned back due to the end of the campaign, achieving nothing except wasting valuable supply.  These nationalist commanders were loyal officers of troops of Chiang Kai-shek's own clique and thus even their communist enemy did not accuse them of being warlords' troops who were reluctant to carry out Chiang's order.  In fact, these commanders of the nationalist second echelon made a correct decision in only sending out detachments for reinforcement instead of everyone as they were ordered because they were already dangerously overstretched in regions surrounded by the enemy from countryside, and if everyone was sent out as ordered, then not only the urban centers would risk being taken over by the enemy due to the undermanned defense, those on the road would also risk being annihilated, not mentioning the fact that the great distance would mean the reinforcement would never be able to reach its destination in time.  Therefore, the correct decision made by the commanders of the nationalist second echelon had succeeded in preserve the nationalist force of the second echelon, which was almost unscratched.  The successful preservation of the force, in turn, would help the nationalist regime later to buy time for troop deployment and strengthening the nationalist positions.

See also
List of Battles of Chinese Civil War
National Revolutionary Army
History of the People's Liberation Army
Chinese Civil War

References

Zhu, Zongzhen and Wang, Chaoguang, Liberation War History, 1st Edition, Social Scientific Literary Publishing House in Beijing, 2000,  (set)
Zhang, Ping, History of the Liberation War, 1st Edition, Chinese Youth Publishing House in Beijing, 1987,  (pbk.)
Jie, Lifu, Records of the Liberation War: The Decisive Battle of Two Kinds of Fates, 1st Edition, Hebei People's Publishing House in Shijiazhuang, 1990,  (set)
Literary and Historical Research Committee of the Anhui Committee of the Chinese People's Political Consultative Conference, Liberation War, 1st Edition, Anhui People's Publishing House in Hefei, 1987, 
Li, Zuomin, Heroic Division and Iron Horse: Records of the Liberation War, 1st Edition, Chinese Communist Party History Publishing House in Beijing, 2004, 
Wang, Xingsheng, and Zhang, Jingshan, Chinese Liberation War, 1st Edition, People's Liberation Army Literature and Art Publishing House in Beijing, 2001,  (set)
Huang, Youlan, History of the Chinese People's Liberation War, 1st Edition, Archives Publishing House in Beijing, 1992, 
Liu Wusheng, From Yan'an to Beijing: A Collection of Military Records and Research Publications of Important Campaigns in the Liberation War, 1st Edition, Central Literary Publishing House in Beijing, 1993, 
Tang, Yilu and Bi, Jianzhong, History of Chinese People's Liberation Army in Chinese Liberation War, 1st Edition, Military Scientific Publishing House in Beijing, 1993 – 1997,  (Volum 1), 7800219615 (Volum 2), 7800219631 (Volum 3), 7801370937 (Volum 4), and 7801370953 (Volum 5)

Conflicts in 1945
Campaigns of the Chinese Civil War
1945 in China
Military history of Hebei
Handan